Donatus, Romulus, Secundian, and 86 Companions (died c. 304) were a group of Christians who were martyred at Concordia Sagittaria (at the time called Iulia Concordia), near Venice, during the Diocletian persecution. Their feast day is celebrated on February 17.

Notes

External links
Saint of the Day, February 17: Donatus, Secundian, Romulus, & Comp.  at SaintPatrickDC.org

Groups of Christian martyrs of the Roman era
304 deaths
4th-century Christian martyrs
4th-century Romans
Year of birth unknown
Christians martyred during the reign of Diocletian